Feminist design refers to connections between feminist perspectives and design. Feminist design can include feminist perspectives applied to design disciplines like industrial design, graphic design and fashion design, and parallels work like feminist urbanism, feminist HCI and feminist technoscience. Feminist perspectives can touch any aspect of the design project including processes, artifacts and practitioners.

History
There is a long history of feminist activity in design. Early examples include movements for dress reform (mid–19th century) and concepts for utopian feminist cities (late 19th century to  the early 20th century). Over time this work has explored topics like beauty, DIY, feminine approaches to architecture, community-based and grassroots projects, among many examples. Some iconic writing includes Cheryl Buckley's essays on design and patriarchy  and Judith Rothschild's Design and feminism: Re-visioning spaces, places, and everyday things.

Feminist insights for design
Isabel Prochner's research explored how feminist perspectives can support positive change in industrial design. She stressed the diversity of feminist perspectives, but also argued that they can help identify systemic social problems and inequities in design and guide socially sustainable and grassroots design solutions.  She wrote that feminist perspectives in industrial design often support:
"Emphasizing human life and flourishing over output and growth
Following best practices in labor/ international production /trade
Choosing an empowering workspace
Engaging in non-hierarchical/ interdisciplinary/ collaborative work
Addressing user needs at multiple levels, including support for pleasure/ fun/ happiness
Creating thoughtful products for female users
Creating good jobs through production/ execution/ sale of the design solution"

References 

Feminism and society